The Alcohol and Gaming Regulation and Public Protection Act is an act governing the sale of alcohol and gaming regulation on Ontario. The act is responsible for the administration of the
Liquor Licence Act, 
Gaming Control Act, 1992
Wine Content and Labelling Act, 2000  
Liquor Control Act (Section 3(1)b, e, f, g and 3(2)a); and 
 Charity Lottery Licensing Order-in-Council 2688/93  

Additionally, it replaces the Liquor Licensing Board of Ontario and the Gaming Control Commission of Ontario.

See also

 Ontario Temperance Act

External links
 http://www.agco.on.ca/

Ontario provincial legislation
Alcohol law in Canada